The Farman F.300 and F.310 were airliners built in France in the early 1930s. They were high-wing strut braced monoplanes with fixed tailskid undercarriage with a trimotor layout popular with several manufacturers of the time. The cockpit and passenger compartment were fully enclosed. Most saw service in  Farman's own airline, whose twelve F.300 variants made up half its fleet in 1931.

One variant, the F.302, was specially built as a single-engine machine to make an attempt at a number of world records. On 9 March 1931, Jean Réginensi and Marcel Lalouette set new distance and duration records over a closed circuit with a 2,000 kg payload, flying  in 17 hours. Another, the F.304 was built as a special trimotor for Marcel Goulette to make a long-distance flight the same month from Paris to Tananarive and back.

The F.310 prototype of a floatplane version of the same basic design, was destroyed while landing during trials, and no further examples were built.

Variants
F.300 prototype with Gnome et Rhône 5Ba engines (1 built)
F.301 production version with Salmson 9Ab engines (6 built)
F.302 version powered with single Hispano-Suiza 12Nb for record attempt, (1 built, later re-engined with Hispano-Suiza 12Lbr
F.303 production version with Gnome et Rhône 5Ba engines (6 built)
F.304 long-range version with Lorraine 9N engines (1 built)
F.305 production version with Gnome et Rhône 9A engines (2 built)
F.306 production version with Lorraine 7Me engines (4 built)
F.310 floatplane version with Salmson 9Ab engines (1 built)

Operators

Air Orient operated four aircraft.
Farman Line operated 12 aircraft.

Aeroput operated 1 F.306 aircraft.

Specifications (F.301)

References

Bibliography

 

1930s French airliners
F.0300
Trimotors
High-wing aircraft
Aircraft first flown in 1930